Wedge Island Lighthouse is a lighthouse in the Australian state of South Australia located on Wedge Island at the entrance to Spencer Gulf.

It was first lit on 29 March 1911 and rebuilt in 1970 and is located on the highest point of the island.  During the Second World War a radar station, with a staff of about 30, was operated at the lighthouse site.

See also 

 List of lighthouses in Australia

References

External links 
 Australian Maritime Safety Authority
 

Lighthouses completed in 1911
Lighthouses in South Australia
1911 establishments in Australia
Spencer Gulf